Snow White: Happily Ever After is a North America-exclusive video game that was released in 1994 for the Super Nintendo Entertainment System. The game was targeted for female video game players. It is based on the 1989 animated Filmation film Happily Ever After, and not the 1937 Disney film. A Sega Genesis version was planned but never released.

Plot

Players follow the continuation of Snow White after the death of her stepmother, the Evil Queen. The Queen's wizard brother Lord Maliss has vowed vengeance and changes Snow White's Prince Charming into a "Shadow Man" humanoid. An entire kingdom must also be freed from Maliss' sorcery. Players can play as either Snow White or her "Shadow Man" protector.

Gameplay
Fruit and stars can be collected while apples can be thrown at enemies and blocks. Players are given four continues to stop the evil Maliss. At the final stage, either Snow White or the Shadow Man confronts Maliss in his ultimate dragon form. Players can change the difficulty level (ranging from easy to medium to hard) if the game gets too frustrating for them. A vast array of continues allow players to restart failed games.

Reception

References

1994 video games
Action video games
Cancelled Sega Genesis games
Fantasy video games
Imagitec Design games
North America-exclusive video games
Side-scrolling video games
Super Nintendo Entertainment System-only games
Video games based on films
Video games developed in the United Kingdom
Video games featuring female protagonists
ASC Games games
Single-player video games